William Thomas Annon (4 June 1912 – 19 October 1983) was an Ulster Unionist Party and Democratic Unionist Party politician.

Annon was born in Lisnaskea, County Fermanagh. He first became prominent as a member of the Ulster Unionist Party, becoming the chairman of its Sydenham branch, in Belfast.  He stood as an independent loyalist in East Belfast at the 1973 Northern Ireland Assembly election, taking 2,192 votes, and was not elected.

He then joined the Democratic Unionist Party, and stood for it in North Belfast for the Northern Ireland Constitutional Convention; he took 4,132 first-preference votes and was the last candidate elected.

Annon was also prominent in the Apprentice Boys of Derry, and represented it on the United Unionist Action Council.  At the 1977 Northern Ireland local elections, he was elected in Belfast Area H, and he held his seat in 1981.

Death
He died in October 1983 in Belfast, still serving on the council.

References

1912 births
1983 deaths
Ulster Unionist Party politicians
Democratic Unionist Party councillors
Independent politicians in Northern Ireland
Members of Belfast City Council
Members of the Northern Ireland Constitutional Convention